Hector Vincent Barreto Jr. (born May 13, 1961) is an American public servant who served as the 21st Administrator of the U.S. Small Business Administration, confirmed on July 25, 2001. George W. Bush nominated him to the post. He resigned on July 2, 2006.

Administrator of the SBA

In July 2001, Hector Barreto was unanimously confirmed by the U.S. Senate as the 21st administrator of the U.S. Small Business Administration. In this capacity, he oversaw the delivery of financial and business development tools to America's entrepreneurs. With a portfolio of direct and guaranteed business loans and disaster loans worth more than $45 billion, the SBA is the largest single financial backer and facilitator of technical assistance and contracting opportunities for the nation's small businesses. Barreto also sat as an ex officio member of the President's Advisory Commission on Educational Excellence for Hispanic Americans.

References

External links
Public domain biography from the SBA
U.S. News article about Barreto
Biography, The Latino Coalition

1961 births
20th-century American businesspeople
Administrators of the Small Business Administration
American financial businesspeople
American politicians of Mexican descent
California Republicans
George W. Bush administration personnel
Living people
Rockhurst University alumni